The IWRG 19th Anniversary Show was an annual professional wrestling major event produced by Mexican professional wrestling promotion International Wrestling Revolution Group (IWRG), which took place on January 1, 2015 in Arena Naucalpan, Naucalpan, State of Mexico, Mexico. The show commemorated the creation of the IWRG 19 years prior on January 1, 1996 when Adolfo "Pirata" Moreno took over running the wrestling in Arena Naucalpan and turned it into the IWRG.

Production

Background
The 2015 International Wrestling Revolution Group (IWRG; Sometimes referred to as Grupo Internacional Revolución in Spanish) anniversary show commemorated the 19th anniversary of IWRG's creation as a wrestling promotion and holding their first show on January 1, 1996. The Anniversary show, as well as the majority of the IWRG shows in general are held in "Arena Naucalpan", owned by the promoters of IWRG and their main arena. The Anniversary Shows generally take place on January 1 each year whenever possible.

Storylines
The event featured five professional wrestling matches with different wrestlers involved in pre-existing scripted feuds, plots and storylines. Wrestlers were portrayed as either heels (referred to as rudos in Mexico, those that portray the "bad guys") or faces (técnicos in Mexico, the "good guy" characters) as they followed a series of tension-building events, which culminated in a wrestling match or series of matches.

Results

References

External links 
 

2015 in professional wrestling
2015 in Mexico
19
January 2015 events in Mexico